Jeanne Marie Tripplehorn (born June 10, 1963) is an American actress. She began her career on stage, acting in several plays throughout the early 1990s, including Anton Chekhov's Three Sisters on Broadway. Her film career began with the role of a police psychologist in the erotic thriller Basic Instinct (1992). Her other film roles include The Firm (1993), Waterworld (1995) and Sliding Doors (1998). On television, she starred as Barbara Henrickson on the HBO drama series Big Love (2006–2011) and as Dr. Alex Blake on the CBS police drama Criminal Minds (2012–2014), and she received a Primetime Emmy Award nomination for her performance as Jacqueline Kennedy Onassis in the 2009 HBO movie Grey Gardens.

Early life 
Tripplehorn was born on June 10, 1963, in Tulsa, Oklahoma, the daughter of Suzanne Ferguson and Tom Tripplehorn, who was once a guitarist with Gary Lewis & the Playboys. Her parents divorced when she was two years old. She graduated from Edison High School in 1981 and spent one semester studying at the University of Tulsa. She performed on the local television shows Creature Feature (1982–83) and Night Shift (1983). She also worked part-time, then full-time on local rock radio station KMOD for several years before leaving for Juilliard. She then attended the Juilliard School's Drama Division as a member of Group 19 (1986–1990), which also included Laura Linney.

Career 

Tripplehorn began her career on stage. She appeared Off-Broadway in John Patrick Shanley's The Big Funk in 1990, then co-starred with Val Kilmer in a 1993 production of John Ford's 1630s play 'Tis Pity She's a Whore. She has also been on Broadway in Anton Chekov's Three Sisters opposite Amy Irving and Lili Taylor. In 1992, she made her film debut, in a supporting role in the erotic thriller Basic Instinct. The following year, she appeared as Abby McDeere opposite Tom Cruise in The Firm and in 1995 had another lead role alongside Kevin Costner in Waterworld. As lead actress, she starred in the 1997 box-office bomb 'Til There Was You. The next few years she had supporting roles in small films, including Office Killer, Monument Ave., and Sliding Doors; and in 1999 appeared opposite Hugh Grant in the British romantic comedy Mickey Blue Eyes. She was cast opposite Madonna in the 2002 film Swept Away.

In 2006, Tripplehorn was cast in a leading role as Barbara Henrickson in the HBO drama series Big Love, opposite Bill Paxton, regarded as the most successful role of her career. In 2009, she played Jacqueline Kennedy Onassis in the HBO movie Grey Gardens. She was nominated for a Primetime Emmy Award for Outstanding Supporting Actress in a Miniseries or a Movie for this performance. In 2011, she appeared in Five, a movie on the Lifetime television network. In July 2012, Tripplehorn joined the cast of CBS procedural Criminal Minds in season eight, replacing Paget Brewster's character Emily Prentiss. She received a six-figure salary per episode of Criminal Minds. She left the series after two seasons and Jennifer Love Hewitt replaced her as a new agent.

Tripplehorn has appeared in the independent films Little Pink House (2017), with Catherine Keener, and Gloria Bell (2018), starring Julianne Moore. In 2020, she returned to television in the Hulu miniseries Mrs. America opposite Cate Blanchett, Sarah Paulson, Rose Byrne, Tracey Ullman and Margo Martindale. She was later cast in a recurring role in the HBO period drama series The Gilded Age starring Christine Baranski and Cynthia Nixon.

Personal life 
Tripplehorn had a relationship with actor Ben Stiller between 1990 and 1996. She married actor Leland Orser in 2000. They have a son.

Filmography

Film

Television

References

External links 

20th-century American actresses
21st-century American actresses
American film actresses
American television actresses
Juilliard School alumni
Living people
Actresses from Tulsa, Oklahoma
University of Tulsa alumni
American stage actresses
1963 births